Singapore competed at the 2017 Asian Indoor and Martial Arts Games held in Ashgabat, Turkmenistan from September 17 to 27. Singapore sent 8 competitors for the multi-sport event. Singapore clinched its only medal in the Muay Thai women's 54kg event.

Participants

Medallists

References 

2017 in Singaporean sport
Nations at the 2017 Asian Indoor and Martial Arts Games